The 1st Secretariat of the Communist Party of Cuba (PCC) was elected in 1975 by the 1st Plenary Session of the 1st Central Committee in the immediate aftermath of the 1st Congress.

Officers

Members

References

Specific

Bibliography
Articles and journals:
 

1st Secretariat of the Communist Party of Cuba
1975 establishments in Cuba
1980 disestablishments in Cuba